The Jefferson Ordnance Magazine in Jefferson, Texas, United States, is located 0.3 miles northeast of the US-59B crossing of Big Cypress Bayou. It was listed on the National Register of Historic Places in 1995.

It is located across the Big Cypress Bayou waterway from Jefferson and Cypress Bayou Railway.  It is claimed by the railway operators and tour guides to be the only remaining Confederate powder magazine from the 1860s.  That claim, appearing at this website advertising a train tour, appears to be false, as it does not take into account powder magazines that are included in surviving confederate forts.  A specific counter-example to the claim is the Confederate Powderworks, in Georgia, whose powder magazines disprove the claim.  
A narrower claim, that it is the only surviving Confederate powder house in Texas and one of few in the U.S., is stated by the Historic Jefferson Foundation.  An even more narrow claim, that it is "the most intact example in East Texas of a Civil War era brick ordnance magazine directly associated with the Trans-Mississippi Department of the Confederate States of America," appears in a planning document prepared by the Texas Historical Commission.

The magazine was built in late 1863 or early 1864.  "Ninety percent of the building is original and remains unaltered except for some weathering, aging brick and some sympathetic repairs."  However, two smaller associated buildings have been dismantled, apparently for their bricks.

The Ordnance Magazine and the property it sits on is owned by the Historic Jefferson Foundation. This property is landlocked and the road to the magazine is on private property, today it can only be viewed by riding the Jefferson and Cypress Bayou Railway, or taking the Turning Basin Riverboat Tour, both of which are attractions in Jefferson, Texas.

See also

National Register of Historic Places listings in Marion County, Texas
Recorded Texas Historic Landmarks in Marion County

References

External links

Short description and photo, at Historic Jefferson Foundation: Landmarks
this website advertising a train tour
Jefferson Ordnance Magazine mention at NRHP.COM, a private website that mirrors U.S. National Register data

Magazines (artillery)
Jefferson, Texas
Buildings and structures in Marion County, Texas
Government buildings completed in 1863
American Civil War on the National Register of Historic Places
Military facilities on the National Register of Historic Places in Texas
National Register of Historic Places in Marion County, Texas
Recorded Texas Historic Landmarks
Brick buildings and structures